Clavocerithium is a genus of sea snails, marine gastropod mollusks in the family Cerithiidae.

Species
Species within the genus Clavocerithium include:

 Clavocerithium taeniatum (Quoy & Gaimard, 1834)

References

Cerithiidae
Monotypic gastropod genera